Wemmel Castle is a former aristocratic estate in the centre of Wemmel in the Belgian province of Flemish Brabant. It was formerly the property of the noble House of Taye.

History 
The castle was originally built as a fortification. In 1649 Philip-Albert Taye, 1st Marquess of Wemmel had his property redesigned in Baroque style. Inside he decorated the rooms with his heraldic crest. In the 17th and 18th centuries it was the main residence of the Marquess of Wemmel until Marie Josepha Taye, 6th Marquess of Assche and 3rd Marquess of Wemmel, married Jean-Antoine van der Noot. In 1838 the castle was sold to the mayor, Willem-Bernard Count of Limburg-Stirum. The house of Limburg-Stirum gave the estate to the local community.

Today 
Today the estate is still the property of the municipality of Wemmel, and functions as town hall. The park is open to the public.

Books 
 DELMELLE J., Wemmel et son Chateau in Brabant, n.p., 1962, p. 11-13.
 DESSAER R., Geschiedenis van Wemmel, Anderlecht-Brussel, 1945, p. 71-78.

References

Castles in Flemish Brabant